Gwyneth Evans may refer to:

Gwyneth Evans, Mogul character played in Judi Dench filmography
Gwyneth Glyn Evans, Welsh poet

See also
Gwyn Evans (disambiguation)